Robert Ellis Reel (June 27, 1892 – December 29, 1974), known professionally as Robert Ellis, was an American film actor, screenwriter and film director. He appeared in more than 160 films between 1913 and 1934. He also wrote for 65 films and directed 61.

Biography
Ellis was born in Brooklyn, New York, on June 27, 1892, and he attended St. Francis Xavier College in New York City.

Ellis's wives included actresses May Allison and Vera Reynolds and screenwriter Helen Logan. He and Logan wed in 1962, following Reynolds's death. His relationship with Reynolds drew public attention in 1938 as a lawsuit ended when the two decided to marry. Reynolds had sued Ellis for $180,000 for breach of promise, asserting that after their 1926 marriage in Greenwich, Connecticut, was found to be invalid, he had promised to marry her but failed to follow through. After a month's hearing, their decision to marry ended the litigation.

On Broadway, Ellis portrayed Dan Huntley in Baxter's Partner (1911). Ellis acted for Kalem and Metro film studios. He was the leading man in the film For Sale (1924), but he often portrayed villains. After acting, he became a screenwriter whose scripts were used in films of Charlie Chan, Jane Withers, and others. He also directed films, including A Fool and His Money and The Figurehead.

On December 29, 1974, Ellis died in Santa Monica, California. He and Logan are buried in adjacent graves in Inglewood Park Cemetery in Inglewood, California.

Selected filmography

 The Apaches of Paris (1915) - Darcelle
 The Glory of Youth (1915) - Hal Crofton - an Athlete
 The Customary Two Weeks (1917) - George Extell
 The Lifted Veil (1917) - Leslie Palliser
 Brown of Harvard (1918) - 'Bud' Hall
 In for Thirty Days (1919) - Brett Page
 Peggy Does Her Darndest (1919) - Honorable Hugh Wentworth
 Upstairs and Down (1919) - Terrence O'Keefe
 Louisiana (1919) - Laurence Ferol
 The Third Kiss (1919) - Rupert Bawlf
 The Spite Bride (1919) - Billy Swayne
 The Tiger's Trail (1919)
 The Imp (1919)
 The Figurehead (1920) - Director
 The Daughter Pays (1920) - Gerald Roseborough
 Handcuffs or Kisses (1921) - Peter Madison
 Ladies Must Live (1921) - Anthony Mulvain
 Wild Honey (1922) - Kerry Burgess
 Chivalrous Charley (1921)
 Love's Masquerade (1922) - Herbert Norwooood
 The Dangerous Little Demon (1922) - Gary McVeigh
 The Infidel (1922) - Cyrus Flint
 Hurricane's Gal (1922) - Steele O'Connor
 The Woman Who Fooled Herself (1922) - Fernando Pennington
 Anna Ascends (1922) - Howard Fisk
 Dark Secrets (1923) - Lord Wallington
 The Flame of Life (1923) - Fergus Derrick
 Mark of the Beast (1923) - Dr. David Hale
 The Wild Party (1923) - Basil Wingate / Stuart Furth
 The Wanters (1923) - Elliot Worthington
 The Law Forbids (1924) - Paul Remsen
 For Sale (1924) - Alan Penfield
 Lovers' Lane (1924) - Dr. Tom Singletoon
 Silk Stocking Sal (1924) - Bob Cooper
 On Probation (1924) - Bruce Winter
 A Cafe in Cairo (1924) - Barry Braxton
 Capital Punishment (1925) - Harry Phillip
 Forbidden Cargo (1925) - Jerry Burke
 Speed (1925) - Nat Armstrong Jr.
 Defend Yourself (1925) - Dr. Poole
 Lady Robinhood (1925) - Hugh Winthrop
 The Part Time Wife (1925) - Kenneth Scott
 Northern Code (1925) - Louis Le Blanc
 S.O.S. Perils of the Sea (1925) - Ralph Seldon
 The Girl from Montmartre (1926) - Jack Ewing
 Ladies of Leisure (1926) - Jack Forrest
 Brooding Eyes (1926) - Phillip Mott
 Whispering Canyon (1926) - Bob Cameron
 Devil's Dice (1926) - Larry Bannon
 Lure of the Night Club (1927) - John Stone
 Ragtime (1927) - Steve Martin, aka 'Slick'
 The Law and the Man (1928) - Ernest Vane
 Marry the Girl (1928) - Harry Wayland
 The Law's Lash (1928) - Corporal Ted Campbell
 Varsity (1928) - Rod Luke
 Freedom of the Press (1928) - Cyrus Hazlett
 Restless Youth (1928) - Robert Haines
 Broadway (1929) - Steve Crandall
 The Love Trap (1929) - Guy Emory
 Tonight at Twelve (1929) - Jack Keith
 Night Parade (1929) - Mr. John W. Zelli
 Undertow (1930) - Jim Paine
 What Men Want (1930) - Howard LeMoyne
 The Squealer  (1930) - Valleti
 Caught Cheating (1931) - Joe Cabrone
 The Last Parade (1931) - A.C. Marino
 Aloha (1931) - Larry Leavitt
 The Fighting Sheriff (1931) - Flash Halloway
 The Good Bad Girl (1931) - Dapper Dan Tyler
 Dancing Dynamite (1931) - Lucas
 Murder at Midnight (1931) - Duncan Channing
 Is There Justice? (1931) - Dan Lawrence
 Mounted Fury (1931) - Paul Marsh
 The Deadline (1931) - Ira Coleman
 The Devil Plays (1931) - Stiles
 One Man Law (1932) - Jonathan P. Streeter
 The Fighting Fool (1932) - Crip Mason
 Behind Stone Walls (1932) - Jack Keene - Man-about-Town
 Scandal for Sale (1932) - Hotel Resident (uncredited)
 A Man's Land (1932) - John Thomas
 Daring Danger (1932) - Hugo DuSang
 American Madness (1932) - Dude Finlay (uncredited)
 The Phantom Express (1932) - Reynolds
 The Last Man (1932) - English Charlie
 Broadway to Cheyenne (1932) - Butch Owens
 Come on Danger! (1932) - Frank Sanderson
 The All American (1932) - Walter Grant
 White Eagle (1932) - Jim Gregory
 Slightly Married (1932) - Brandon
 Speed Demon (1932) - Langard
 Women Won't Tell (1932) - District Attorney
 Call Her Savage (1932) - Hotel Manager (uncredited)
 Officer Thirteen (1932) - Jack Blake
 The Penal Code (1932) - James Forrester
 The Monster Walks (1932, writer)
 Treason (1933) - Col. Jedcott
 Reform Girl (1933) - Kellar
 The Constant Woman (1933) - Leading Man
 Soldiers of the Storm (1933) - Moran
 The Thrill Hunter (1933) - Al Blake
 The Sphinx (1933) - Inspector James Riley
 The Important Witness (1933) - Jack (Duke) Farnham
 Police Call (1933) - Police Chief Crown
 Notorious But Nice (1933) - Prosecuting Attorney
 Only Yesterday (1933) - (uncredited)
 In the Money  (1933, writer)
 Dance Girl Dance (1933, writer)
 I've Got Your Number (1934) - Turk Garrison
 Madame Spy (1934) - Sulkin
 Dancing Man (1934) - Cavendish
 Gambling Lady (1934) - Mr. Carter - Lawyer (uncredited)
 A Very Honorable Guy (1934) - Gangster (uncredited)
 Now I'll Tell (1934) - Minor Role (uncredited)
 Friends of Mr. Sweeney (1934) - Casino Manager (uncredited)
 A Girl of the Limberlost (1934) - Frank Comstock
 Kid Millions (1934) - Desert Rider (uncredited) (final film role)
 In Love with Life (1934, writer)
 Charlie Chan in Egypt (1935, writer)
 The Jones Family in Big Business (1937, writer)
 Sun Valley Serenade (1941, writer)
 Iceland (1942, writer)
 Hello, Frisco, Hello (1943, writer)
 El Paso (1949, writer)
 Peter Pan (1953, writer)

References

External links

1892 births
1974 deaths
Burials at Inglewood Park Cemetery
American male film actors
American male silent film actors
American male screenwriters
Male actors from New York City
20th-century American male actors
People from Brooklyn
Film directors from New York City
Screenwriters from New York (state)
20th-century American male writers
20th-century American screenwriters